Lim Heon-yong (korean:임헌영, hanja:任軒永, born January 15, 1941) is a South Korean author, journalist, critic, educator. His birth name is Lim Joon-nyul (임준렬).

Life 
He was born in 1941 in Uiseong, North Gyeongsang, Korea. His father, Lim woo-bin, was killed by the government of South Korea in 1950.  In 1965, he graduated from Chung-Ang University and in 1968 he received a master's of literature.  From 1965 to 1972, he was a journalist for Pharmaceuticals News, Kyunghyangsinmun. He was an instructor at Chung-Ang University. From March 1996 to August 1998, he was Chung-Ang University Graduate School of Art's Visiting Professor and in 1998 Chung-Ang University Korean Languages Studies Professor.

External links
 
 Lim Heon-yong:Joonang University's News

1941 births
South Korean educators
Korean politicians
Korean revolutionaries
South Korean journalists
Living people
People from Uiseong County